Barbarella is an annual music festival held in Santo Domingo, Dominican Republic since 2011 by Presidente.

Line-Up

2011
The first Barbarella was held on June 22, 2011 at San Souci Convention Center, Santo Domingo. The lineup consisted of:

 Empire of the Sun
 Laidback Luke
 Dirty South
 Remady

2012
The 2012 edition of Barbarella included a bigger proposal. It was held on June 30, 2012 at San Souci Convention Center.

 Otto Knows
 Chris Lake
 Dev
 Hook N Sling
 Shawnee Taylor
 Jochen Miller
 Alex Gaudino
 Local Super Heroes

2013

The 2013 edition of Barbarella was held on June 28, 2013 at Estadio Quisqueya, Santo Domingo. The lineup included artists that had never been in the country before. This is the full lineup:

 Afrojack
 Dragonette
 R3hab
 Apster
 Leroy Styles
 Inna
 Emma Hewitt
 Hard Rock Sofa
 Bassjackers
 Nadia Ali
 Local Super Heroes

2014
The 2014 Barbarella was held on June 18, 2014 at Estadio Quisqueya, Santo Domingo. This show had a duration of 12 hours (from 6PM to 6AM). Dimitri Vegas & Like Mike, one of the most expected performers, canceled their presentation several weeks before the show. As of today, the reason of this unexpected cancellation is still unknown.

 Icona Pop
 Steve Angello
 Hardwell
 Capital Cities
 Connor Cruise
 Dyro
 NERVO
 Showtek
 Dimitri Vegas & Like Mike (canceled)
 Local Super Heroes

2015 "The Journey"

This year Barbarella took place in the same location (Estadio Quisqueya) on June 3.

The Official Line up is:

 Deorro
 DVBBS
 Kiesza
 Krewella
 Matthew Koma
 NERVO 
 Nicky Romero
 Passion Pit (Canceled)
 Robin Schulz
 Sam Feldt
 Tommy Trash
 Joseant Hidalgo (Local DJ)
 Dav Motta (Local DJ)
 "Lash" (Local DJ's)

2016

The sixth Barbarella edition took place May 25, 2016 in Estadio Quisqueya. The proposal this year was headed by French DJ David Guetta.

The Official Line up is:

 Afrojack
 Don Diablo
 David Guetta
 DJ Snake
 Jack Ü
 MAKJ
 Steve Aoki
 Emma Hewitt
 Jack Novak
 Dav Motta
 Lash
 Joseant Hidalgo
 Neff U Music
 Chael Produciendo

2018 
The seventh edition of Barbarella Festival will take place on May 30, 2018 at Estadio Olímpico Félix Sánchez. The official Line up this year is:

 Afrojack
 Axwell & Ingrosso
 The Chainsmokers
 Galantis
 Tchami X Malaa
 Showtek
 Zedd
 Andino
 Joseant Hidalgo (Local DJ)
 Kent Dow
 Mute Cake

See also

List of electronic music festivals

References

External links
Presidente Official Website

Music festivals established in 2011
2011 establishments in the Dominican Republic
Annual events in the Dominican Republic
Electronic music festivals in the Dominican Republic
Summer events in the Dominican Republic
Events in Santo Domingo